The Sweden women's national handball team is the national team of Sweden. It is governed by the Swedish Handball Federation and takes part in international handball competitions.

Honours

Competitive record
 Champions   Runners-up   Third place   Fourth place

Results

Olympic Games

World championship

Competitive record at the World championship

Record against other teams at the world championship

*Results against the Czech republic also include Czechoslovakia (−1993) and the combined team of the Czech republic and Slovakia (1993).
Results updated 16 June 2014.

European championship

Competitive record at the European championship
{|class="wikitable" style="text-align: center;"
|-
!Year
!Position
!width="15"|
!width="15"|
!width="15"|
!width="15"|
!width="15"|
!width="15"|
!width="15"|+/-
|-
| 1994||7th||6||3||0||3||134||145||−11
|-
| 1996||8th||6||2||0||4||142||171||−29
|-
| 1998||colspan="8" rowspan=2|did not qualify
|-
| 2000
|-
| 2002||15th||3||0||0||3||79||94||−15
|-
| 2004||14th||3||0||0||3||68||81||−13
|-
|style="border: 3px solid red"| 2006||6th||7||3||0||4||156||170||−14
|-
| 2008||9th||6||2||2||2||134||135||−1
|- style="background: silver"
| 2010||2nd||8||6||0||2||199||176||+23
|-
| 2012||8th||6||3||1||2||153||142||+11
|-bgcolor=cc9966
| 2014||3rd||8||5||1||2||238||220||+18
|-
|style="border: 3px solid red"| 2016||8th||6||1||1||4||149||156||−7
|-
| 2018||6th||7||3||1||3||191||192||−1
|-
| 2020||11th||6||1||1||4||148||162||−14
|-
| 2022||5th||7||5||0||2||206||179||+27
|-
| 2024|| colspan="8" rowspan="2"|TBD
|-
| 2026
|-
|style="border: 3px solid red"| 2028|| colspan="8"|Qualified aco-host|-
!Total!!!!72!!29!!7!!36!!1791!!1844!!-53
|}

Record against other teams at the European Championship

Performance in other tournaments

 Carpathian Trophy 1994 – Third place
 GF World Cup 2006 – Fifth place
 Møbelringen Cup 2001 – Third place
 Møbelringen Cup 2011 – Third place
 Carpathian Trophy 2015 – Winner

Team
Current squad
The squad chosen for the two matches against France in March 2023.Caps and goals as of 5 March 2023.Head coach: Tomas Axnér

Notable players
Several Swedish players have seen their individual performance recognized at international tournaments, either as Most Valuable Player, top scorer, best defense player or as a member of the All-Star Team.
MVP
 Linnea Torstenson, 2010 European Championship
 Isabelle Gulldén, 2014 European Championship
All-Star Team
 Annika Wiel Fredén, 2006 European Championship
 Nathalie Hagman, 2016 Summer Olympics, 2017 World Championship
 Linn Blohm, 2019 World Championship
 Jamina Roberts, 2020 Summer Olympics
Top scorers
 Isabelle Gulldén, 2014 European Championship (58 goals)
 Nathalie Hagman, 2021 World Championship (71 goals)
Best defense player
 Johanna Wiberg, 2010 European Championship
 Sabina Jacobsen, 2014 European ChampionshipIncomplete''

Famous players
 Åsa Eriksson
 Matilda Boson
 Annika Wiel Fredén
 Tina Flognman
 Madeleine Grundström
 Linnea Torstenson
 Nathalie Hagman
 Mia Hermansson-Högdahl
 Isabelle Gulldén
 Sabina Jacobsen

Individual all-time records

Most matches played
Total number of matches played in official competitions only.

Last updated: 5 March 2023 Source: svenskhandboll.se

Most goals scored
Total number of goals scored in official matches only.

Last updated: 5 March 2023 Source: svenskhandboll.se

Head coach history

References

External links

IHF profile

National team
Women's national handball teams
Handball